The Sisters of the Holy Cross (CSC) are one of three Catholic congregations of religious sisters which trace their origins to the foundation of the Congregation of Holy Cross by the Blessed Basil Anthony Moreau, CSC, at Le Mans, France in 1837.  The other two congregations of religious women in the tradition of the Holy Cross Family are the Marianites of Holy Cross (New Orleans, Louisiana) and the Sisters of Holy Cross (Montreal, Quebec, Canada). Their motherhouse is located in Notre Dame, Indiana.

They are distinct from the Sisters of the Holy Cross Menzingen, a teaching congregation founded separately in Switzerland in 1844.

History 

In 1837, Father Moreau, established the Congregation of Holy Cross. The congregation took its name from the neighborhood of Sainte Croix in Le Mans, where the 12th-century church, Notre Dame du Sainte Croix, was to become the mother church of the new foundation. In 1841 Fr. Moreau founded a society of sisters within the Congregation.

In June 1843, four sisters left the mother house in France to join Father Edward Sorin C.S.C. at his mission at Notre Dame, Indiana. A second story had been added to the log chapel at Notre Dame for their convent. The Sisters of the Holy Cross had been founded originally to care for the housework in the boarding schools conducted by the priests. Upon their arrival, they took charge of the sacristy, infirmary, clothes room, etc. In 1844 a novitiate was opened at Bertrand, Michigan, six miles from Notre Dame. The sisters taught the children of the neighbourhood, and cared for several orphans. With assistance from the Society of the Propagation of the Faith the sisters were able to extend their work.

A school was opened at Pokagon, Michigan, in 1845. This was followed by other foundations at St. John's, Mackinac, Louisville, Lowell (Indiana), Laporte, Michigan City, and Mishawaka. In 1847 four sisters with some companions from the mother-house in France opened a convent at St. Laurent, Canada, which formed the nucleus of the subsequently erected province. In 1849 four sisters took charge of the boys' orphan asylum in New Orleans, and from there a house was opened in 1854 in New York with the sanction of Father Moreau. Sisters were sent to this establishment from Notre Dame, Canada, and New Orleans. Misunderstandings due to orders issued from France and Notre Dame led to the withdrawal of the American sisters from the new foundations, the houses of New Orleans and New York remaining subject to France. The year 1856 saw the sisters well-established in Chicago and Philadelphia. They had charge of the cathedral parochial school, St. Joseph's German school, and an industrial school in Chicago, and were installed in St. Paul's and St. Augustine's schools in Philadelphia. Later they opened a select school for boarders and day-pupils in West Philadelphia. These foundations all promised success, but the strained relations between the mother-house at Le Mans under Father Moreau and the Provincial House at Notre Dame under Father Sorin led to the recall of the sisters.  In 1853, Eliza Gillespie, sister of Neal Henry Gillespie C.S.C., received the habit from Father Sorin, and sailed for France to make her novitiate as Sister Angela. After profession, she returned to Bertrand and took charge of the academy, 1854. From that time until her death (1887), Mother Angela laboured indefatigably to develop the highest intellectual and religious qualities in both teachers and students, and must be regarded as the virtual foundress of the order in the United States.

On 15 August, 1855, the convent and academy were moved from Bertrand to South Bend, Indiana. Saint Mary's Academy eventually grew to become Saint Mary's College. By 1861 the sisters were operating schools and orphanages throughout the eastern half of the United States. 

When Father Moreau visited the provinces of Canada, Louisiana, and Notre Dame in 1857, he promulgated the Decree of Separation of the sisters from the priests and brothers. In 1869, at the advice of  Bishop John Henry Luers of Fort Wayne, the Sisters of the Holy Cross in the United States separated from the motherhouse in France and formed a distinct congregation.

American Civil War
Oliver P. Morton, governor of Indiana, requested the assistance of 12 sisters from the congregation. Mother Angela Gillespie along with five other sisters volunteered as nurses. The sisters were sent to Cairo, Illinois, where they met General Ulysses S. Grant. The sisters were then sent to the regimental headquarters of General Lew Wallace's brigade in Paducah, Kentucky. All told, some eighty sisters served as nurses, managing hospitals in Kentucky, Illinois, Tennessee, Missouri, and Washington, DC. 

Thomas Ewing, father-in-law of General William Tecumseh Sherman, was a kinsman of Mother Angela; U.S. Representative James G. Blaine was her cousin. When generals failed to secure needed aid for the sick and wounded, she made trips to Washington on their behalf. Her influence in Washington was significant both because of her family connections and because of the recognition of her work for the sick and wounded soldiers. Eighty sisters nursed the wounded and ill soldiers in Illinois, Missouri, Kentucky and Tennessee. Four sisters served on the U.S. Navy's first hospital ship, the "Red Rover". They were the first female nurses to serve on board a Navy ship.

Post Civil War
Commander Davis of the Western Flotilla presented Mother Angela with two civil war cannons, "Lady Polk" and "Lady Davis." During WWII, the cannons were melted down for scrap iron. There is a monument that stands in memory of the sisters that served in the Civil War erected September 20, 1924. It is located in Washington D.C., across from St Matthew's Cathedral. 

Mother Angela returned to Notre Dame, Indiana, where her brother Rev. Neal Gillespie C.S.C. was soon appointed editor of Ave Maria Magazine. Rev. Sorin put Mother Angela Gillespie in charge of editorial management. While the Holy Cross Brothers served as typographers and pressmen, the sisters assisted in various editorial and production capacities.

Location 
The Sisters of the Holy Cross are represented in the following countries:

United States (1843)
Bengal, India (now Bangladesh) (1853)
Brazil (1947)
Uganda (1967)
Peru (1982)
Ghana (1983)
Mexico (1987)

Institutions 
1844: Saint Mary's College, Notre Dame, Indiana
1868: Academy of the Holy Cross, Kensington, Maryland
1869-1990: Saint Mary's Academy, Alexandria, Virginia
1875-1969: College of Saint Mary-of-the-Wasatch, Salt Lake City, Utah
1935-1973: Dunbarton College of the Holy Cross, Washington, D.C.
1947: Colégio Santa Maria (São Paulo), São Paulo, Brazil
1905: Holy Cross Anglo-Indian School (Tuticorin), Tamilnadu, India
1949-1971 & 1985-1992: Blessed Sacrament School, Alexandria, Virginia
1950: Holy Cross Girls' High School (Dhaka), Dhaka, Bangladesh
1950: Holy Cross College (Dhaka), Dhaka, Bangladesh
1952-1972: Cardinal Cushing College, Brookline, Massachusetts

Ministry timeline  
1974-97  Sisters minister in Tiberias, Israel    
1993 Sisters open a house of spiritual study for Holy Cross sisters in India

See also
 Congregation of Holy Cross
United States Navy Nurse Corps (Civil War)

References

External links
Sisters of the Holy Cross
 Gift of the Cross Lenten Reflections in the Holy Cross Tradition

Congregations of Holy Cross
Notre Dame, Indiana
Religious organizations established in 1841
Catholic female orders and societies
Catholic religious institutes established in the 19th century
Catholic teaching orders
Saint Mary's College (Indiana)
Saint Mary's College (Indiana) faculty